2016–17 FIS Alpine Ski Europa Cup was the 46th season of the FIS Alpine Ski Europa Cup.

Standings

Overall

Downhill

Super G

Giant Slalom

Slalom

Combined

References

External links
 

FIS Alpine Ski Europa Cup